Baron Robert Rothschild (16 December 1911, in Brussels – 3 December 1998, in London) was a Belgian diplomat. He helped to draft the Treaty of Rome of 1957, the foundation of the European Economic Community (EEC) in 1958.

Biography
His father, a businessman of German-Jewish descent, descended from Moses Amschel Bauer, of Frankfurt am Main, whose son Mayer Amschel Rothschild, together with his five sons, founded the Rothschild banking dynasty. Robert decided to become a diplomat. His father was a friend of Paul Spaak, whose son Paul-Henri Spaak became foreign minister of Belgium in 1936. Robert passed the diplomatic service examination in 1936, and joined the private office of Paul-Henri Spaak in April 1937.

As an officer in the Belgian army reserve on the outbreak of World War II, Robert Rothschild returned to his regiment and his brother Marcel started his service at the Brigade Piron. In May 1940, he was captured by the Germans and sent to Colditz Castle as a Prisoner of war (POW). In 1941, he was sent back to Brussels and released. With the help of underground organisations and the Special Operations Executive (SOE) he escaped to Vichy France. He obtained an exit visa from a pro-Belgian French official and travelled to neutral Spain. He made his way to London to join the Belgian government in exile of Hubert Pierlot, which posted him to the diplomatic legation in Lisbon (Portugal). Lisbon was crawling with spies, all of whom knew one another's identity. They lunched at the same restaurants, peering at one another over their menus.

Robert remained in Lisbon until 1944, when he was sent, at his request to China. He became first secretary at the Belgian embassy in Chungking, the headquarters of Chiang Kai-shek's government. During the Japanese occupation, there was a lull in the Chinese civil war. The Communists of Mao Zedong even had an envoy in Chungking in the person of Zhou Enlai, whom he grew to like. After the Japanese surrender, he flew to Shanghai, where, in 1946, he was appointed consul general. The Chinese civil war revived and in 1949 the Communists entered Shanghai. Under pressure from the French, who hoped to protect their interests in Indochina, Belgium declined to recognise the People's Republic of China for the next 20 years. He considered this a political mistake and regretted the failure to comprehend the rivalry between Soviet and Chinese Communism.

In early 1950, he left Shanghai for Washington, D.C. as second counsellor at the Belgian embassy. It was the time of the Korean War and the build-up of NATO and after two years in Washington, Robert went to Paris as a Belgian representative on the council of NATO.

In 1954, Rothschild was appointed chef de cabinet of Paul-Henri Spaak at the Belgian foreign ministry. For the next two years, he worked together with Spaak and Jean Charles Snoy et d'Oppuers on the Treaty of Rome before the final signing of the treaty in 1957. Shortly before the treaty was signed, Rothschild was standing beside Spaak gazing over the Forum Romanum in Rome, when Spaak said "I think that we have re-established the Roman Empire without a single shot being fired."

Robert was due to join the Belgian delegation at NATO after the summit conference in Paris in 1960, between Nikita Khrushchev and Dwight D. Eisenhower. But, because of the Lockheed U-2 spy plane crisis, the conference was a failure and, so, Rothschild was sent to the Belgian Congo as number two to the governor. He arrived in Leopoldville (now Kinshasa) two days after the rebellion by the constabulary, egged on by the Pan-Africanist Congolese independence leader, Patrice Lumumba. After the independence of the Congo from Belgium in 1960, Katanga, the richest of the six provinces of the Belgian Congo seceded on 11 July, and the Belgians decided to move to Elisabethville (now Lubumbashi) in Katanga. While in Katanga, Rothschild had to steer his way delicately between Moise Tshombe the Rightist Katangan leader, who wanted Belgian support for the independence of the State of Katanga and Belgium, which was reluctant to grant it.

After two years as ambassador to Switzerland, where in 1966, he was president of the executive committee of the General Agreement on Tariffs and Trade, he went as ambassador to Paris. In 1973, he was appointed ambassador in London, where he remained en post until 1976, and then lived in London for the rest of his life.

Distinctions
 : Knight Commander of the Order of St Michael and St George (1963)

Bibliography
 Rothschild, Robert, Une certaine idée de l'Europe, dans Le rôle des Belges et de la Belgique dans l'édification européenne. 1981.

References

Sources
 Van Tichelen, Joseph, Souvenirs de la négociation du traité de Rome, dans Le rôle des Belges et de la Belgique dans l'édification européenne. 1981, pp. 327–343.
 Belgian Events (ed. May 2007)

1911 births
1998 deaths
Diplomats from Brussels
Belgian civil servants
Jewish Belgian politicians
Belgian people of German-Jewish descent
Ambassadors of Belgium to France
Ambassadors of Belgium to the United Kingdom
Ambassadors of Belgium to Switzerland
Commanders Crosses of the Order of Merit of the Federal Republic of Germany
Belgian prisoners of war in World War II
Belgian military personnel of World War II